Ante Jelavić (born 21 August 1963) is a Bosnian Croat politician who served as the Chairman of the Presidency of Bosnia and Herzegovina from 1999 to 2000. He was elected to the post of chairman as a candidate of the Croatian Democratic Union.

Presidency (1998–2001)
Jelavić served as Chairman of the Presidency of Bosnia and Herzegovina from 15 June 1999 until 14 February 2000. He was removed from his position of the three-member Presidency by decision of the High Representative for Bosnia and Herzegovina, Wolfgang Petritsch, in March 2001. Petritsch justified his decision by observing that Jelavić had "directly violated the constitutional order of the Federation of Bosnia and Herzegovina and of Bosnia and Herzegovina"; in particular he cited Jelavić's leading role in the 'Croatian National Assembly' rally in Mostar on 3 March 2001, calling for a separate governing entity for Bosnian Croats.

Investigations and indictments
On 22 January 2004, Jelavić was arrested in his home in Mostar, on charges of corruption. On 4 November 2005, the Court of Bosnia and Herzegovina in Sarajevo found Jelavić guilty of abuse of office, embezzlement of office, and lack of commitment in office. The findings of guilt related, in part, to the use of funds from the Federal Ministry of Defence to purchase shares in banking and insurance firms Hercegovačka Banka and Herzegovina Osiguranje. Judge Malcolm Simmons presided, A sentence of ten years imprisonment was subsequently pronounced, although Jelavić was not present at the sentencing hearing  and remained at large.

His attorney, Dragan Barbarić, acting in his client's absence, initiated a successful appeal against the first instance verdict on the grounds that it lacked proper factual description of the offence and as such was in violation of criminal procedural law. On 4 July 2006, with the verdict revoked, the appeal panel, presided over by Judge Nedžad Popovac, called for new proceedings in which evidence presented at the first trial will be re-presented and in which new evidence may also be presented.

References

1963 births
Living people
People from Vrgorac
Croats of Bosnia and Herzegovina
Croatian Democratic Union of Bosnia and Herzegovina politicians
Politicians of the Federation of Bosnia and Herzegovina
Members of the Presidency of Bosnia and Herzegovina
Chairmen of the Presidency of Bosnia and Herzegovina